Slave to the Grind is the second studio album by American heavy metal band Skid Row, released on June 11, 1991, by Atlantic Records. The album displayed a harsher sound than its predecessor and lyrics that avoided hard rock cliches. Slave to the Grind is the first heavy metal album to chart at number one on the Billboard 200 in the Nielsen SoundScan era, selling 134,000 copies in its opening week. The album was certified 2× platinum by the Recording Industry Association of America (RIAA) in 1998 for shipping two million copies in the United States. It produced five singles: "Monkey Business", "Slave to the Grind", "Wasted Time", "In a Darkened Room" and "Quicksand Jesus". Skid Row promoted the album opening for Guns N' Roses in 1991 and as a headliner the following year.

Composition and recording
Skid Row wrote most of Slave to the Grind in a New Jersey studio and demoed the tracks with Michael Wagener, who produced their previous album. Recording began in late 1990 and took place at two studios: New River in Fort Lauderdale, Florida and Scream in Studio City, California. Slave to the Grind marked the band's move toward a heavier sound, with the title track verging on speed metal, but the album also includes power ballads and a few lighter tracks reminiscent of pop punk. The lyrics were more complex, criticizing modern ways of life, authority, politics, drugs, and organized religion, among other topics. Wagener said the demoing and pre-production went well, and the title track was recorded and mixed in an hour, and was placed on the album without being remixed.

During a February 2017 interview for the Backspin segment of Yahoo! Music, vocalist Sebastian Bach revealed that the version of the title track included in the finished album is actually the original demo the band recorded during pre-production with producer Michael Wagener. The band recorded a proper version during the album sessions, but were unable to match the intensity of the demo, and therefore opted to use the latter instead.

Cover art
Sebastian Bach's father, David Bierk, painted the cover art, which is actually a long mural, continued inside the album's booklet. Although it is set in the medieval era, it depicts people using modern technological gadgets. The cover was inspired by Caravaggio's Burial of St. Lucy from 1608 and shows John F. Kennedy in the crowd.

Release and promotion
When recording finished, Skid Row opened for Guns N' Roses on the 1991 North American leg of their Use Your Illusion Tour. In 1992, Skid Row took Pantera and Soundgarden as supporting bands on its Slave to the Grind Tour. Two different versions of the album were released: the original and a "clean" version, in which "Get the Fuck Out" is replaced with the less-offensive "Beggar's Day". Music videos were produced for all five singles: "Monkey Business", "Slave to the Grind", "Wasted Time", "In a Darkened Room" and "Quicksand Jesus", all of which feature on the video album No Frills Video. Skid Row's label Atlantic Records was not supportive of the group's transformation when filming the video for the title track. The label wanted a bikini model to star in the video, but the idea was turned down by the band because the song was not about female sexuality. A music video was also made for "Psycho Love" in 3D which featured on the video album Road Kill.

Critical reception

Slave to the Grind received generally positive reviews by music critics. Spins Daina Darzin said the album had integrity and passion, and reminded her of early Mötley Crüe and Judas Priest. Martin Popoff called the album "a surprising and welcome jolt to the system", with Skid Row "proving their mettle, their self-worth, their guts" on songs taking the listener "to dark unsettling places where reflection collides with worry." AllMusic's Steve Huey said Slave to the Grind was more aggressive than its predecessor and called it one of the best examples of mainstream hard rock and heavy metal. Brenda Herrmann of the Chicago Tribune observed that Bolan and Sabo improved their songwriting and wrote positively about the group's attitude and humor. Conversely, Rolling Stone'''s David Fricke thought Skid Row had not matured lyrically at all, rehashing the glam metal cliches. However, he complimented Wagener's production and the band's interplay and sound. Robert Christgau was less enthusiastic and graded the album a "dud", indicating "a bad record whose details rarely merit further thought". Janiss Garza of the Entertainment Weekly praised the ballads' lyrical depth and the fury of "Riot Act" and the title track, giving the album an A−.Slave to the Grind debuted at number one on the Billboard 200, selling 134,000 copies in its first week. The album was the first to debut atop the Billboard 200 in the Nielsen SoundScan era, since it was uncommon for albums to open at number one before SoundScan began tracking sales in 1991. Previously, the only album to debut at number one had been Captain Fantastic and the Brown Dirt Cowboy'' by Elton John in 1975.

Track listing

† Album liner notes incorrectly list the length as 4:57.

Personnel
Credits are adapted from the album's liner notes.

Skid Row
Sebastian Bach – lead vocals
Dave Sabo – guitars, backing vocals
Scotti Hill – guitars, backing vocals
Rachel Bolan – bass, backing vocals
Rob Affuso – drums, percussion

Production
Michael Wagener – producer, mixing
Riley J. Connell – assistant engineer
Craig Doubet – assistant engineer
George Marino – mastering
Bob Defrin – art direction

Charts

Weekly charts

Year-end charts

Certifications

References

External links

Skid Row (American band) albums
1991 albums
Atlantic Records albums
Albums produced by Michael Wagener